Macrocalamus is a genus of snakes of the family Colubridae.

Geographic range
The genus Macrocalamus is endemic to the Malay Peninsula.

Species
The following eight species are recognized as being valid.
Macrocalamus chanardi 
Macrocalamus emas 
Macrocalamus gentingensis 
Macrocalamus jasoni 
Macrocalamus lateralis 
Macrocalamus schulzi 
Macrocalamus tweediei 
Macrocalamus vogeli

References

Further reading
Boulenger GA (1894). Catalogue of the Snakes in the British Museum (Natural History). Volume II., Containing the Conclusion of the Colubridæ Aglyphæ. London: Trustees of the British Museum (Natural History). (Taylor and Francis, printers). xi + 382 pp. + Plates I-XX. (Genus Macrocalamus, p. 327; species M. lateralis, p. 327).
Günther ACLG (1864). The Reptiles of British India. London: The Ray Society. (Taylor and Francis, printers). xxvii + 452 pp. + Plates I-XXVI. (Macrocalamus, new genus, p. 198; M. lateralis, new species, p. 199 + Plate XVIII, figure D).
Vogel, Gernot; David, Patrick (1999). "A revision of the genus Macrocalamus (Serpentes: Colubridae), with description of a new species and a key to the genus". Raffles Bull. Zool. 47 (2): 309–332. (Macrocalamus schulzi, new species).

Macrocalamus
Snake genera
Taxa named by Albert Günther